Between 1900 and 1913, Hector Guimard was responsible for the first generation of entrances to the underground stations of the Paris Métro. His Art Nouveau designs in cast iron and glass dating mostly to 1900, and the associated lettering that he also designed, created what became known as the Métro style (style Métro) and popularized Art Nouveau. However, arbiters of style were scandalized and the public was also less enamored of his more elaborate entrances. In 1904 his design for the Opéra station at Place de l'Opéra was rejected and his association with the Métro ended; many of his station entrances have been demolished, including all three of the pavilion type (at Bastille and on Avenue de Wagram at Étoile). Those that remain are now all protected historical monuments, one has been reconstituted, and some originals and replicas also survive outside France.

Construction and characteristics

The initial network of the Paris Métropolitain (soon commonly abbreviated to "Métro") was planned and built at one time in order to minimize disruption to the city from on-going construction and to open Line 1 and two branches in time for the Exposition Universelle in 1900. A design competition was held for the above-ground components, to alleviate the public's fear that they would mar the cityscape with an industrial appearance. The new entrances were stipulated to be "as elegant as possible but above all very light, prioritising iron, glass and ceramic". However, the submitted entries were all too bulky for many of the sidewalk sites. Adrien Bénard, the financier whose bank was underwriting the construction, liked the new Art Nouveau style and therefore instead persuaded the Compagnie du chemin de fer métropolitain de Paris (CMP) to appoint the still young Hector Guimard to design the entrances to the underground stations, while the elevated stations were designed by Jean-Camille Formigé, chief architect of the City of Paris.

Rather than stone, Guimard used cast iron set in concrete both to reduce costs and to suit the sinuous Art Nouveau forms; they were painted in a green emulating weathered brass. (For a renovation that began in 1999, the RATP, the Paris transportation authority, restored the entrances to two slightly different shades: at sites with a lot of vegetation, vert wagon ('train-car green'), the dark green used for Parisian public works at the turn of the 20th century, and at fully urban sites, a slightly bluer shade, vert allemand ('German green').) He designed standardized components, including railing cartouches incorporating the letter "M" and signs in his own distinctive lettering reading "Métropolitain" or, at narrow entrances, "Métro"; later the use of the lettering was extended to a holder for a system map and for advertising (porte-plan) with the station name above. In addition to speed (the first set of entrances were installed within six months of their design) and relatively low cost in manufacture and adaptation to different sizes and locations of entrances, all of this gave the system a stylistic identity. 

Three of the entrances took the form of free-standing pavilions or small stations, including waiting rooms: one at Bastille and two on Avenue de Wagram at Étoile. These were in a style influenced by Japanese pagodas. At Étoile Guimard provided exterior doors for elevators, although the elevators were not built. Eight simpler but still elaborate structures, labeled "Édicule B" by Guimard, were installed at the termini of Line 1 as originally opened and at two other major stations. These consisted of three-sided glass-roofed structures enclosing the stairway, with a projecting canopy. A variation on this format, "Édicule A", lacked the canopy and was erected at two stations, Saint-Paul and Reuilly – Diderot. These édicule types of entrance, which have come to be called libellules because they resemble dragonflies, in some cases had decorated wall panels surfaced in reconstituted lava. The great majority of the entrances built (154) were unroofed enclosures, dubbed an entourage. A transitional form between the entourage and the édicule, railings with a roof and canopy, was used for one entrance at the Gare de Lyon métro station.

At many of the entourages, the top of the steps is surmounted by a "Métropolitain" or "Métro" sign in a holder that extends between two risers in the form of sinuous stalks, traditionally compared to lily-of-the-valley, each bearing a light in the form of a red-orange globe reminiscent of an eye or a flower. These were not ready until 1901, the year after the system first opened, and Guimard varied the "Métropolitain" lettering somewhat between stations and twice revised the design, which reached its final form in 1902.

Reception and later history
The Guimard entrances received a generally warm reception. Salvador Dalí later called them "those divine entrances to the Métro, by grace of which one can descend into the region of the subconscious of the living and monarchical aesthetic of tomorrow". By way of what became known as le style Métro, they popularized Art Nouveau, which had been a style known largely to connoisseurs of the avant garde.

However, critics and many of the public were hostile to the libellules in particular, and criticized the green as "German" and the lettering as "un-French" and, according to critic André Hallays in Le Temps, "confus[ing to] little children who are trying to learn their letters and ... stupefy[ing to] foreigners". On the Champs-Élysées, for example at Marbeuf (now part of Franklin D. Roosevelt), simple stone walls with discreet carved signage were used instead, and a plain design was also used at Bourse. Unhappiness with Guimard's 1904 design for the Opéra station, described in Le Figaro as having "contorted ramps" and "enormous frog-eye lamps", and increasing costs led to the CMP severing its relationship with him. The CMP bought Guimard's molds and rights and a total of 141 of his entrances were ultimately produced, the last in 1913.

The CMP continued in later years to replace some of Guimard's designs with more sober entrances by Cassien-Bernard, often a plain balustrade in white stone, for example at Gare de l'Est, Madeleine, Montparnasse, and Saint-François-Xavier. Modernization beginning after World War I also led to the demolition of many, especially the more elaborate. Shortly before World War II, it was suggested that those remaining should be scrapped for their metal. Art Nouveau had only briefly been in fashion and only became popular once more in the last quarter of the 20th century.

Entrances extant today
Ninety-one Guimard entrances survived until 1970. Eighty-six are still extant and protected as historical monuments; six were protected in 1965, the remainder in 1978. These include two original Type B édicules: at Porte Dauphine, on its original site and with the wall panels, and at Abbesses (moved from Hôtel de Ville in 1974). A third Type B of varying form at Châtelet is a 2000 recreation. The remainder of the preserved entrances are simple enclosures or entourages, with or without the light and sign arch. In addition, two sides of an entourage form an entryway to the headquarters building of the RATP.

Surviving Guimard entrances in Paris protected as historical monuments

Guimard entrances elsewhere
Some subway systems and museums outside France have examples of Guimard Métro entrances, mostly replicas presented by the RATP in exchange for art works. 
 Entourage Guimard: Square-Victoria-OACI station on the Montreal Metro in Canada has a genuine Guimard entrance made from parts of demolished Paris entrances (with map holder and "Métropolitain" sign and holder reproduced from the original molds). It was installed in 1967. During restoration in 2001–2002, it was found to have the last examples of the original glass light globes, which in Paris had been replaced with plastic for safety; one was returned to the RATP and the other placed on display in the Montreal Museum of Fine Arts.
 Bellas Artes station on the Mexico City Metro in Mexico has a Guimard entrance installed in 1998.
 Picoas station on the Lisbon Metro in Portugal has a Guimard entrance installed in 1995.
 Kievskaya station on the Moscow Metro in Russia has a Guimard entrance installed in 2007.
 Van Buren Street station on the Metra Electric Line in Chicago had a Guimard entrance installed in 2001.
 An Entrance to the Paris Métropolitain: The National Gallery of Art in Washington, D.C., United States has a Guimard entrance in its sculpture garden, first shown at the gallery in a 2000–2001 exhibition on Art Nouveau and permanently installed in the garden in 2003.
 The Museum of Modern Art in New York City, United States has the archway consisting of the light stalks and "Métropolitain" sign from the Guimard entrance to Raspail station.
 The Dali Theater Museum in Figueres (Girona, Spain) has a pair of the light stalks from a Guimard Métro entrance, which are exhibited on the patio.

See also
Architecture of the Paris Métro

References

Further reading
 Frédéric Descouturelle, André Mignard, and Michel Rodriguez. Le métropolitain d'Hector Guimard. Paris: Somogy, 2004. . .

External links

1900s architecture
Art Nouveau architecture in Paris
Art Nouveau railway stations
Cast-iron architecture
Paris Métro
Metro